Valda may refer to:

People
 Augusto Valda Vargas (born 1957), Bolivian politician and journalist
 Valda Aveling (1920–2007), Australian pianist, harpsichordist and clavichordist
 Valda Berzins, Australian business woman
 Valda Cooper, American journalist and reporter
 Valda Hansen (1932–1993), American actress
 Valda James (born 1928), British politician
 Valda Lake (born 1968), British tennis player
 Valda Osborn (born 1934), British figure skater
 Valda Setterfield (born 1934), British-American postmodern dancer and actress
 Valda Unthank (1909–1987), Australian cyclist who held numerous records for long distance cycling, mostly set during
 Valda Valkyrien (1895–1956), Danish silent film actress

Places
 Valda (Altavalle), Trentino, Italy

Other
 262 Valda, main belt asteroid
 Valda (beetle), genus of ant-loving beetles in the family Staphylinidae
 ŽIA valda, is Lithuanian investment company

Estonian feminine given names
Latvian feminine given names
English feminine given names